was a Japanese professional wrestling event promoted by DDT Pro-Wrestling (DDT). The event took place on August 23, 2009, in Tokyo at the Ryōgoku Kokugikan. The event featured ten matches, four of which were contested for championships. The event was announced on December 28, 2008 at the Never Mind 2008 event and its name was revealed at a press conference on February 13, 2009. In prevision on the event, DDT broadcast their tour titled "Road to Ryōgoku" on Fighting TV Samurai. This was the first event held under the Peter Pan name.

Storylines
The Ryōgoku Peter Pan event featured ten professional wrestling matches that involved different wrestlers from pre-existing scripted feuds and storylines. Wrestlers portrayed villains, heroes, or less distinguishable characters in the scripted events that built tension and culminated in a wrestling match or series of matches.

By winning the KO-D Openweight Championship Contendership Tournament on July 10, Kota Ibushi earned a title match in the main event of Ryōgoku Peter Pan against KO-D Openweight Champion Harashima.

Event
The second dark match was a tag team deathmatch set to end at 5:00 pm in which the result would decide of the fate of Michael Nakazawa's anus. However, according to the rules of the match, every possible outcome would result in Nakazawa's anus being blown up by fireworks.

On the main card, the opening match saw the debut of Soma Takao.

The following match was a Rumble rules match in which Yoshihiko, an inflatable love doll with male make-up accompanied to the ring by Yusuke Inokuma, defended its Ironman Heavymetalweight Championship. During the match, Shoichi Ichimiya appeared under two different names: Giru Nakano, a parody of Bull Nakano and Keigi Mutoh, a parody of Keiji Mutoh. After being eliminated early on thus losing its title to Toru Owashi, Yoshihiko reappeared in the match as Sumo Yoshihiko and ended-up as the runner-up of the match.

After the match, Sumo Yoshihiko pinned Toru Owashi to win back the Ironman Heavymetalweight title and become the 825th champion.

The fifth match featured Mitsuya Nagai from Dradition and Munenori Sawa from Battlarts.

The sixth match was a Winner takes all match for nine titles (most of those being comedic titles). Danshoku Dino was holding the DDT Extreme Championship, the World Ōmori Championship, the Greater China Unified Sichuan Openweight Championship, the Umemura PC Juku Copy & Paste Championship and the DJ Nira World Championship while Masa Takanashi was holding the J.E.T. World Jet Championship, the GAY World Anal Championship, the DJ Nira World And Strongest In History Championship and the World Mid Breath Championship. As a result of the match, all titles except the World Ōmori Championship were unified with the DDT Extreme Championship.

The seventh match featured The Great Sasuke from Michinoku Pro Wrestling and was a "Weapon Rumble" in which various weapons secretly chosen by the participants beforehand were being introduced one after another at regular intervals. Some of those weapons included a bowl of oden, Kaientai Dojo joshi wrestler Bambi with a whip, a mobile phone and hypnosis.

The eighth match featured Masahiro Chono from New Japan Pro-Wrestling.

The ninth match featured Piza Michinoku from Kaientai Dojo as well as Jun Kasai from the hardcore promotion Pro-Wrestling Freedoms.

Results

Rumble rules match

Four-way tag team elimination match

Footnotes

References

External links
The official DDT Pro-Wrestling website
Ryōgoku Peter Pan at ProWrestlingHistory.com

DDT Peter Pan
2009 in professional wrestling
August 2009 events in Japan
Professional wrestling in Tokyo
2009 in Tokyo
Events in Tokyo